Shinji Mori (September 12, 1974 – June 28, 2017) was a right-handed pitcher in professional baseball.

Career
From -, he played for the Seibu Lions in Nippon Professional Baseball.  After the 2005 season, he was acquired by the Tampa Bay Devil Rays through the posting system. Originally slated to compete for the Devil Ray's closer job during the  MLB season, he tore the labrum in his shoulder and missed the entire season. He was subsequently released by the Devil Rays.

Returning to Japan, in 2009 Mori joined the Ishikawa Million Stars of the semi-pro Baseball Challenge League as a pitcher-coach. After retiring from playing, he took over as the manager of the Million Stars in 2010, staying through the 2014 season. He returned to active duty as a player in 2013, and was the Million Stars' player-manager in 2013–2014.

On June 25, 2017, Mori was hospitalized in Fukuoka Hospital, and after three days, on June 28, 2017, Mori died of sepsis caused by infection with streptococcus. He was 42 years old.

References

External links

1974 births
2017 deaths
Baseball player-managers
Durham Bulls players
Ishikawa Million Stars players
Japanese expatriate baseball players in the United States
Managers of baseball teams in Japan
Nippon Professional Baseball pitchers
Seibu Lions players
People from Iwakuni, Yamaguchi
Baseball people from Yamaguchi Prefecture